is a retired male high jumper from Japan. His personal best jump is 2.33 metres, achieved in July 2006 in Kobe. This was the Japanese record until February 2019, when Naoto Tobe broke it by two centimetres. He is part of the Matsuzaka Generation.

Personal bests

Achievements

National titles
Japanese Championships
High jump: 2003, 2005, 2006, 2007, 2009

See also
List of Asian Games medalists in athletics

References

External links 

Naoyuki Daigo at JAAF 
Naoyuki Daigo at Fujitsu Track & Field Team  (archived)
Naoyuki Daigo at TBS  (archived)

1981 births
Living people
Athletes from Tokyo
Japanese male high jumpers
Olympic male high jumpers
Olympic athletes of Japan
Athletes (track and field) at the 2008 Summer Olympics
Asian Games bronze medalists for Japan
Asian Games medalists in athletics (track and field)
Athletes (track and field) at the 2006 Asian Games
Medalists at the 2006 Asian Games
World Athletics Championships athletes for Japan
Japan Championships in Athletics winners
20th-century Japanese people
21st-century Japanese people